The 2016 CAF Champions League knockout stage was played from 16 September to 23 October 2016. A total of four teams competed in the knockout stage to decide the champions of the 2016 CAF Champions League.

Qualified teams
The winners and runners-up of each of the two groups in the group stage qualified for the knockout stage.

Format

In the knockout stage, the four teams played a single-elimination tournament. Each tie was played on a home-and-away two-legged basis. If the aggregate score was tied after the second leg, the away goals rule would be applied, and if still tied, extra time would not be played, and the penalty shoot-out would be used to determine the winner (Regulations III. 26 & 27).

Schedule
The schedule of each round was as follows.

Bracket
The bracket of the knockout stage was determined as follows:
Semi-finals: (group winners host second legs)
SF1: Winner Group A vs. Runner-up Group B
SF2: Winner Group B vs. Runner-up Group A
Final: Winner SF1 vs. Winner SF2 (order of legs decided by draw)

Semi-finals

In the semi-finals, the group A winners played the group B runners-up, and the group B winners played the group A runners-up, with the group winners hosting the second leg.

|}

Zamalek won 6–5 on aggregate.

Mamelodi Sundowns won 3–2 on aggregate.

Final

In the final, the two semi-final winners played each other, with the order of legs decided by an additional draw held after the group stage draw.|}

Mamelodi Sundowns won 3–1 on aggregate.

References

External links
Orange CAF Champions League 2016, CAFonline.com

3